Over 60 Minutes With Luba is a compilation of popular songs from the first three albums on Capitol-EMI of Canada by Canadian singer, Luba and band.  Two additional songs appear on this release, including the hit single "The Best Is Yet To Come" which is featured on the motion picture soundtrack for 9½ Weeks and a live version of the Percy Sledge classic "When A Man Loves A Woman."  A 12" club mix of the Canadian gold smash "Let It Go" is also included on this album.

Track listing
The Best Is Yet To Come – 3:54 (from the soundtrack 9½ Weeks, 1986)
When A Man Loves A Woman – 5:03 (previously unreleased)
Let It Go [Extended Club Mix] – 6:11 (previously unreleased)
Innocent (With An Explanation) – 3:40 (from Between the Earth & Sky, 1986)
Act Of Mercy - 5:31 (from Between the Earth & Sky, 1986)
Secrets And Sins - 3:41 (from Secrets and Sins, 1984)
Even In The Darkest Moments - 3:52 (from Between the Earth & Sky, 1986)
How Many - 4:14 (from Between the Earth & Sky, 1986)
Sacrificial Heart - 3:31 (from Secrets and Sins, 1984)
Storm Before The Calm - 3:28 (from Secrets and Sins, 1984)
Everytime I See Your Picture - 4:01 (from Secrets and Sins, 1984)
Strength In Numbers - 4:29 (from Between the Earth & Sky, 1986)
What You Believe - 4:26 (from Between the Earth & Sky, 1986)
Raven's Eyes - 3:22 (from Luba (EP), 1982)
Back To Emotion - 4:07 (from Between the Earth & Sky, 1986)
Resurrect The Love - 4:24 (from Secrets and Sins, 1984)

Personnel
 Luba: Vocals
 Peter Marunzak: Drums & Drum Programming
 Michael (Bell) Zwonok: Bass & Backing Vocals
 Mark Lyman: Guitar & Backing Vocals
 Michel Corriveau: Keyboards
 Jeff Smallwood: Guitar & Backing Vocals
 The Sherwoods: Backing Vocals

Additional musicians

 Guitars: Alain Couture, Corrado Rustici
 Bass: Randy Jackson
 Keyboards: Pierre Marchand, Daniel Barbe, Sterling Crew, Preston Glass, Walter Afanasieff
 Drums/Percussion: Daniel Lanois, Narada Michael Walden, Andy Narell, Dick Smith
 Backing Vocals: Alain Couture, Shawne Jackson, Sharon Lee Williams, Daniel Barbe
 Emulator Programming: Alain Simard
 Saxophone: Kenny G on "How Many"

References
 The Ectophiles' Guide to Good Music. Luba: Credits. Retrieved Apr. 17, 2007.

External links
 Official Luba Website
 Luba at canoe.ca
 Luba on MySpace

1987 compilation albums
Luba (singer) albums